The 1986 United States Senate election in Missouri was held on November 4, 1986. Incumbent Democratic U.S. Senator Tom Eagleton decided to retire instead of seeking a fourth term. Republican Governor Kit Bond won the open seat. This was the only seat that Republicans flipped in 1986.

Major candidates

Democratic
 Harriett Woods, Lieutenant Governor

Republican
 Kit Bond, former Governor

Results

See also 
 1986 United States Senate elections

References 

Missouri
1986
1986 Missouri elections